Årsta may refer to:

 Årsta district, Stockholm, Sweden, part of Enskede-Årsta-Vantör borough
 Årsta Castle, a castle in the municipality of Haninge, Stockholm County